Yershovka is a rural locality (a selo) in Zhirnovsky District, Klenovskoye Rural Settlement, Volgograd Oblast, Russia. The population was 228 as of 2010. There are 7 streets.

Geography 
Yershovka is located in forest steppe of Khopyorsko-Buzulukskaya Plain, 52 km northwest of Zhirnovsk (the district's administrative centre) by road. Romanovka is the nearest rural locality.

References 

Rural localities in Zhirnovsky District
Kamyshinsky Uyezd